Sarfarosh is a 1985 Indian Hindi-language action drama film, produced by Prasan Kapoor and directed by Dasari Narayana Rao. It stars Jeetendra, 
Leena Chandavarkar and Sridevi and music composed by Laxmikant–Pyarelal. The film is a remake of Telugu-language film Sardar Papa Rayudu (1980).

Plot 
During the Indian Independence movement, Satyadev, Dharmadhikari, and Buddhiram, the three corrupt Indian officials, frame an Indian rebel Jwala Singh and also have him incarcerated in prison. Many years later, after he completes his sentence, he seeks out the three, so he can avenge himself. He will soon find that the only person standing in his way is none other than his very own son.

Cast 
Jeetendra as Jwala Singh / Suraj Kapoor (Double Role)
Leena Chandavarkar as Seeta
Sridevi as Vijaya
Prem Chopra as Nyay Sharma
Ranjeet as Satyadev
Kader Khan as Dharmadhikari
Asrani as Raghu
Nirupa Roy as Jwala's Mother
Pran as Baba
Bharat Bhushan as Raja Raghunathraj
Bindu as Item Dancer
Satyendra Kapoor as Singer in song 'Yaad Rakhna'

Soundtrack 
Three songs of the soundtrack, 'Sridevi Sridevi' (picturized on Sridevi, whose character has a different name in the movie, thus an ode to her real name), 'Chori Ho Gayi' and 'Raat Meri Sayan Se' became popular.

References

External links 

1980s Hindi-language films
1985 films
Indian historical action films
Films directed by Dasari Narayana Rao
Films scored by Laxmikant–Pyarelal
Hindi remakes of Telugu films
Indian prison films
1980s action drama films
Films about corruption in India
Indian nonlinear narrative films
Films about rebellions
1980s historical action films
Indian action drama films
Indian films about revenge
Fictional revolutionaries
Indian historical drama films
1980s historical drama films
Films set in the Indian independence movement
1985 drama films
Historical action films